Mud Islands Game Reserve is a protected area in South Australia covering ten islands at the southern side of Lake Alexandrina about  south-east of Goolwa. The game reserve is described as providing ‘an ideal habitat for water birds, particularly waterfowl’ and that ‘duck shooting is permitted during open season.’   Since 2000, the game reserve has been located within the boundaries of the gazetted locality, Coorong.

The game reserve is classified as an IUCN Category VI protected area.  In 1980, it was listed on the now-defunct Register of the National Estate.

See also
Duck hunting in South Australia
List of islands within the Murray River in South Australia

References

External links
Mud Islands Game Reserve webpage on protected planet

Game reserves of South Australia
Protected areas established in 1968
1968 establishments in Australia
South Australian places listed on the defunct Register of the National Estate
Murray River